Waverly Jack Slattery (December 24, 1904 – August 29, 1983) served in the California State Senate for the 4th District from 1959 to 1963. During World War II he served in the United States Army.

References

United States Army personnel of World War II
1904 births
1983 deaths
20th-century American politicians
Democratic Party California state senators